Arab-Persians are people who are of both mixed Arab and Persian ethnic or cultural background, which is common in Iran, Kuwait, Iraq, Bahrain, and to a lesser extent, Lebanon and Syria.

History
In pre-Islamic times, there were many Arabs who lived in the cultural sphere of Persia and used Persian as their written language. These are referred to as Persian Arabs (Al-‘Arab Al-Furs).

One of Prophet Muhammed's early followers and disciples, Salman Al-Farsi, was Persian.

After the rise of Islam and the Arab conquest of Persia, Persians, in turn, began to use Arabic as their written language alongside Persian. Many famous Muslim scientists and philosophers during the time of the Abbasid caliphate were ethnic Persians who wrote their scholarly works in Arabic while continuing to write literary works and poetry in Persian - famous examples are Avicenna and Khayyam.

Self-identification
The term “Arab-Persian” is rarely used as a self-appellation. Most tend to identify more strongly as either Persian or Arab and consider themselves to be members primarily of one ethnic group, but at the same time being aware of their mixed background. For many the most important factor determining their identity is the sovereign state in which they live or from which their recent ancestors came from. For example, most Shia Kuwaitis are of Persian ancestry.

In Iran

Ethnic Arabs and Arabic speakers live alongside Persians primarily in the Khuzestan, Bushehr, Hormozgan, and Khorasan regions of Iran. Intermarriages exist between Iranian Arabs and Iranian Persians. Over 1 million Iranian Sayyids are of Arab descent but most are Persianized, mixed and consider themselves Persian and Iranian today. The majority of Sayyids migrated to Iran from Arab lands predominantly in the 15th to 17th centuries during the Safavid era. The Safavids transformed the religious landscape of Iran by imposing Twelver Shiism on the populace. Since most of the population embraced Sunni Islam, and an educated version of Shiism was scarce in Iran at the time, Ismail imported a new group of Shia Ulama who predominantly were Sayyids from traditional Shiite centers of the Arabic-speaking lands, such as Jabal Amel (of southern Lebanon), Syria, Bahrain, and southern Iraq in order to create a state clergy. The Safavids offered them land and money in return for loyalty.

In Kuwait

Most Ajam (both Sunni and Shia) resided in the Sharq historical district in the old Kuwait City, thereby forming a linguistic enclave which preserved the language for generations until the discovery of oil. They communicated in Persian between each other, and did not frequently mingle with Arabic speakers who resided in other districts of Kuwait City until after the industrialisation of Kuwait City which scattered people who lived in the districts of Kuwait City to the suburbs. The linguistic enclave was not present any longer therefore the Ajam had to learn Kuwaiti Arabic to survive in the new environment. The majority of Shia Kuwaiti citizens are of Iranian ancestry. Some Kuwaitis of Iranian origin are Sunni  Muslims such as the Al-Kandari and Al-Awadhi families of Larestani Persian ancestry.

In Bahrain

Persian migration into Bahrain  goes back to the days of the Sassanid and Achaemenid Persian empire, though in modern times there has been a constant migration for hundreds of years. There has always been a migration of Persian-speaking Shi'a into Bahrain.
 
In 1910, the Persian community funded and opened a private school, Al-Ittihad school, that taught Persian, besides other subjects. In the Manama Souq, many Persians were clustered in the neighborhood of Mushbir. However they resettled in other areas with the development of new towns and expansion of villages during the reign of Isa bin Salman Al Khalifa. Today, a significant number is based in Muharraq's Shia enclaves and Bahrain Island's modernized Shia towns.

In Iraq

In the 1970s, Saddam Hussein exiled between 350,000 to 650,000 Shia Iraqis of Iranian ancestry (Ajam). Iraqi Persians follow Shia Islam and some of them are even Sayyids. Persians have a long history in Iraq and were actually there before the Arab conquest.

In Lebanon
Arab-Persian mixes are actually common among Lebanese Shias, many Iranians in Lebanon and Lebanese people in Iran ended up intermarrying and settling. Many notable Shia Muslims from Lebanon are mixed with Persian.

In Syria
In Syria, a small community of Arab-Persians exists in the Alawite/Nusayri-majority areas, mostly in Latakia and Tartus, with the rest being in Damascus.

See also
 Arab-Berber
 History of Arabs in Afghanistan
 Jābir ibn Hayyān
 Abu Nuwas

References

Persian people
Arab diaspora in Asia
Iranian diaspora in Asia
Arab groups
Arab diaspora
Iranian diaspora
Arabs in Iraq
Ethnic groups in Iran
Ethnic groups in Iraq
Ethnic groups in Bahrain
Ethnic groups in Kuwait
Ethnic groups in the Middle East